Pelči Parish is an administrative unit of Kuldīga Municipality in the Courland region of Latvia. The parish has a population of 1099 (as of 1/07/2010) and covers an area of 56.57 km2.

Villages of Pelči parish 
 Ābele
 Kaltiķi
 Pelči
 Raidstacija
 Rimzātciems
 Skrundenieku ciems
 Slipiņciems

Parishes of Latvia
Kuldīga Municipality
Courland